Baron Pierre Dubois Davaugour (before 1620–1664) was the French soldier and Governor of New France from 1661 to 1663.

He was related to the old family who were counts and dukes of Penthièvre in Brittany. Davaugour was a carrier soldier (40 years) in the French Army and died while fighting against Turks in Serinvans-Zrin at a fortress (likely Zrin Castle) on the border with French ally and Habsburg controlled Kingdom of Croatia during the Austro-Turkish War.

His son Charles Augustin de Saffray de Mésy succeeded him as Governor of New France.

References

External links 

Davaugour, Baron Pierre Dubois
1664 deaths
Year of birth unknown
1620 births
17th-century Canadian politicians